The Virginia rail (Rallus limicola) is a small waterbird, of the family Rallidae.
These birds remain fairly common despite continuing loss of habitat, but are secretive by nature and more often heard than seen. They are also considered a game species in some provinces and states, though rarely hunted. The Ecuadorian rail is often considered a subspecies, but some taxonomic authorities consider it distinct.

Description

Adults are mainly brown, darker on the back and crown, with orange-brown legs. To walk through dense vegetation, they have evolved a laterally compressed body and strong forehead feathers adapted to withstand wear from pushing through vegetation. Virginia rails have the highest ratio of leg-muscle to flight-muscle of all birds (25% - 15% of body weight respectively). They have long toes used to walk on floating vegetation. Their tail is short and they have a long slim reddish bill. Their cheeks are grey, with a light stripe over the eye and a whitish throat. Chicks are black. Juveniles are blackish brown on upperparts with rufous on the edge of feathers and brownish bill and legs. Their underparts are dark brown to black, while the face is grayish brown. Both sexes are very similar, with females being slightly smaller. Adults measure 20–27 cm, with a wingspan of 32–38 cm, and usually weigh 65-95 g.

Taxonomy
The Virginia rail is in the genus Rallus, a genus of other long-billed rails. It is thought to be closely related to R. semiplumbeus and R. antarcticus.
There are currently two recognized subspecies of Rallus limicola:
R. l. limicola Vieillot, 1819
 R. l. friedmanni Dickerman, 1966

Habitat and Distribution
The Virginia rail lives in freshwater and brackish marshes, sometimes salt marshes in winter. Northern populations migrate to the southern United States and Central America. On the Pacific coast, some are permanent residents. Its breeding habitat is marshes from Nova Scotia to Southern British Columbia, California and North Carolina, and in Central America. It often coexists with soras, another species of wetland rail.

Behavior
The Virginia rail often runs to escape predators, instead of flying. When it does fly, it is usually short distances or for migration. It can also swim and dive using its wings to propel itself.

Vocalizations
This bird has a number of calls, including a harsh kuk kuk kuk, usually heard at night. It also makes grunting noises. In spring, it will make tick-it or kid-ick calls.

Diet
The Virginia rail probes with its bill in mud or shallow water, also picking up food by sight. It mainly eat insects and other aquatic invertebrates, like beetles, flies, dragonflies, crayfish, snails and earthworms. It can also eat aquatic animals like frogs, fish and some small snakes, as well as seeds. Animal preys constitute the biggest part of this bird's diet, but vegetation contributes to its diet in the fall and winter.

Reproduction
Courtship starts around May. The male will raise his wings and run back and forth next to the female. Both sexes bow, and the male feeds the female. Before copulation, the male approaches the female while grunting. Virginia rails are monogamous. Both parents build the nest and care for the young, whereas only the male defends the territory. The nest is built as the first egg is laid and consists of a basket of woven vegetation. The nest is made using plants like cattails, reeds and grasses. They also build dummy nests around the marsh. They nest near the base of emergent vegetation in areas with vegetation creating a canopy above the nest.

This birds lays a clutch of 4 to 13 white or buff eggs with sparse gray or brown spotting. The eggs generally measure . They are incubated by both parents for a period of 20 to 22 days, in which the parents continue to add nesting material to conceal the nest. When the eggs hatch, the parents feed the young for two to three weeks, when the chicks become independent. The young can fly in less than a month. The pair bond between the parents breaks after the young become independent.

References

External links
 Virginia rail - Rallus limicola - USGS Patuxent Bird Identification InfoCenter
 Virginia rail species account - Cornell Lab of Ornithology
  
 
 

Virginia rail
Birds of North America
Birds of Mexico
Virginia rail
Virginia rail